Edgefield Historic District may refer to:

Edgefield Historic District (Edgefield, South Carolina), listed on the National Register of Historic Places in Edgefield County, South Carolina
Edgefield Historic District (Nashville, Tennessee), listed on the National Register of Historic Places in Davidson County, Tennessee